MCCL may refer to:

 The year 1250
 Middlesex County Cricket League
 Minnesota Citizens Concerned for Life